José David Payares Julio (born April 27, 1986) is a Venezuelan amateur boxer best known for winning the silver medal at the PanAm Games 2007 in the men's heavyweight division with 91 kg/201 lbs limit. He qualified for the 2008 Summer Olympics at the super heavyweight class.

Career
At the world championships 2005 he lost in the first round to Jasur Matchanov.

He won the South American Games 2006 against Rafael Lima, at the Central American Games 2006 he finished second behind Osmay Acosta.

In February in a first PanAm qualifier he ran right into Acosta again and lost. In a second qualification tournament he beat two opponents inside the distance and Canadian Sebastien Lalumiere 20:5 to easily qualify.

In Rio at the PanAm Games main event he bested US southpaw Adam Willett 12:8 and Jorge Quiñones from Ecuador but was beaten in the final once again by Acosta.

Super Heavyweight
At the world championships 2007 he competed at super heavyweight and upset Hungarian Csaba Kurtucz 12:7 but ran into eventual winner Roberto Cammarelle and was outclassed 4:27.

At the first qualifier he lost to Robert Alfonso, at the second Olympic qualifier he defeated Michael Hunter to go to Beijing.
In the meaningless final he also beat fellow qualifier Oscar Rivas.

In Beijing he was upset in his first bout 5:7 by Algerian Newfel Ouatah.

At the 2010 South American Games he won Gold at Super Heavyweight vs. Deivi Julio and Jorge Quinonez.

At the 2011 Pan American Games he was KOd by Juan Hiracheta.

At the Olympic qualifier he lost to Dominic Breazeale and didn't qualify.

References

 PanAm Games 2007
 Yahoo profile

Living people
Heavyweight boxers
Olympic boxers of Venezuela
Boxers at the 2007 Pan American Games
Boxers at the 2008 Summer Olympics
Boxers at the 2011 Pan American Games
1986 births
Venezuelan male boxers
Pan American Games silver medalists for Venezuela
Pan American Games medalists in boxing
Central American and Caribbean Games silver medalists for Venezuela
Central American and Caribbean Games bronze medalists for Venezuela
South American Games gold medalists for Venezuela
South American Games medalists in boxing
Competitors at the 2006 South American Games
Competitors at the 2010 South American Games
Competitors at the 2006 Central American and Caribbean Games
Competitors at the 2010 Central American and Caribbean Games
Central American and Caribbean Games medalists in boxing
Medalists at the 2007 Pan American Games